"Stay With You" is a single by Lemon Jelly. It samples "I Wanna Stay With You" by Gallagher and Lyle.  It charted at number 31 in the UK Singles Chart in December 2004.

Track listings

CD: Impotent Fury / IFXLS 201 CD United Kingdom 

 Also released on 10" (IFXLT 201)

DVD: Impotent Fury / IFXLS 201 DVD United Kingdom

References

Lemon Jelly songs
2004 singles
XL Recordings singles
2004 songs